Jordi Arrese was the defending champion, but lost in the quarterfinals this year.

Alberto Berasategui won the tournament, beating Oscar Martinez in the final, 4–6, 7–6(7–4), 6–3.

Seeds

Draw

Finals

Top half

Bottom half

External links
 Main draw

ATP Athens Open
1994 ATP Tour